The year 1962 in archaeology involved some significant events.

Explorations
 Ian Graham makes first map of Maya site of El Mirador.
 Historic American Buildings Survey records Johnson's Mill Bridge, a wooden covered bridge over Chickie's Creek in Lancaster County, Pennsylvania.

Excavations
 Little Brickhill excavations 1962–1964 in Buckinghamshire, England.
 Ongoing excavations at Aphrodisias in Anatolia begun by Kenan Erim under the aegis of New York University.
 Excavation of Tel Arad by Yohanan Aharoni (continues until 1967).

Publications
 Lewis R. Binford - Archaeology as Anthropology.
 Peter H. Sawyer - The Age of the Vikings

Finds
 January 15 - The Derveni papyrus, which dates to 340 BCE, making it the oldest surviving manuscript in Europe, is discovered at a grave site in Macedonia (Greece).
 September 6 - Blackfriars Ship I discovered by Peter Marsden in London.
 October 8 - Bremen cog discovered in the Weser.
 Neolithic remains at Jiahu discovered by Zhu Zhi.
 First evidence for human occupation of Australia during the last glacial period discovered at Kenniff Cave, Queensland.

Awards

Events
March - First Conference of Western Archaeologists on Problems of Point Typology at Idaho State College Museum.

Births
 Nikolai Grube, German Mayan epigrapher
 Li Feng, Chinese American sinologist

Deaths
 William Duncan Strong, American archaeologist (born 1899)

References

Archaeology
Archaeology by year